Khairul Shahril bin Mohamed is a Malaysian politician and has served as Perak State Executive Councillor.

Election Results

References

United Malays National Organisation politicians
Members of the Perak State Legislative Assembly
Perak state executive councillors
21st-century Malaysian politicians
Living people
Year of birth missing (living people)
People from Perak
Malaysian people of Malay descent
Malaysian Muslims